Gerson Díaz (born 11 February 1972) is a Venezuelan former footballer. He played in 25 matches for the Venezuela national football team from 1993 to 1997. He was also part of Venezuela's squad for the 1995 Copa América tournament.

References

External links
 

1972 births
Living people
Venezuelan footballers
Venezuela international footballers
Place of birth missing (living people)
Association football midfielders
Caracas FC players
Deportivo Miranda F.C. players
Venezuelan expatriate footballers
Expatriate footballers in Argentina
20th-century Venezuelan people
21st-century Venezuelan people